The following is a list of people executed by the U.S. state of New Hampshire from 1739 to 1939.

Capital punishment was abolished in New Hampshire on May 30, 2019; however the abolition was not retroactive and one inmate remains on the state's death row.

See also 
 Capital punishment in New Hampshire
 Capital punishment in the United States

References

External links 
Executions in the U.S. 1608–1987: The Espy File (by state) (PDF)

Executed
New Hampshire